Stephen Gary Patrick (born February 4, 1961) is a Canadian former professional ice hockey player. He was drafted in the first round, 20th overall, by the Buffalo Sabres in the 1980 NHL Entry Draft. Patrick played 250 games in the National Hockey League (NHL) with the Sabres, New York Rangers, and Quebec Nordiques between 1980 and 1986.

On December 6, 1984, the Sabres traded Patrick and Jim Wiemer to the New York Rangers in exchange for Chris Renaud and Dave Maloney.

His brother is former player and current Winnipeg Ice head coach James Patrick, and their father Stephen Patrick played football for the Winnipeg Blue Bombers, and served in the Legislative Assembly of Manitoba. Patrick's son Nolan was drafted second overall in the 2017 NHL Entry Draft by the Philadelphia Flyers, and currently plays for the Vegas Golden Knights.

Awards and achievements
 Ed Chynoweth Cup (WHL) Championship (1979)
 Honoured Member of the Manitoba Hockey Hall of Fame

Career statistics

Regular season and playoffs

See also
List of family relations in the NHL

References

External links

Steve Patrick's biography at Manitoba Hockey Hall of Fame

1961 births
Living people
Brandon Wheat Kings players
Buffalo Sabres draft picks
Buffalo Sabres players
Canadian ice hockey forwards
Canadian people of Ukrainian descent
National Hockey League first-round draft picks
New York Rangers players
Quebec Nordiques players
Rochester Americans players
St. James Canadians players
Ice hockey people from Winnipeg